Abezhdan may refer to:
 Abezhdan, Andika
 Abezhdan-e Malmulil
 Abezhdan, alternate name of Sar Gach, Andika
 Abezhdan, Ramhormoz
 Abezhdan-e Sofla, Ramhormoz County
 Abezhdan District, in Andika County
 Abezhdan Rural District, in Andika County